Astronidium ovalifolium is a species of plant in the family Melastomataceae. It is endemic to French Polynesia.

References

Flora of French Polynesia
ovalifolium
Data deficient plants
Taxonomy articles created by Polbot